Prague High School is the public high school serving Prague, Oklahoma. The official mascot of the school is The Red Devils.

History
Located on U.S. Route 62, it is part of the Prague Public Schools district, which was founded in 1902. The high school was opened in 1906. The school's football team first played in 1915, and was undefeated during the regular season of 1917, losing only to Norman High School for the state championship. The school applied for state accreditation in 1942.

In 2012 the school and school superintendent Rick Martin were both criticized when the High School principal David Smith refused to give valedictorian Kaitlin Nootbaar her high school diploma for using the word "Hell" in her graduation speech. Many thought this was a strange 'out of proportions' reaction that caught worldwide attention. A logo of a red devil is no problem but the word 'hell' in a speech is.

Notable alumni
 Stan Case - CNN broadcast news anchor
 Kyle Denney- former Cleveland Indians pitcher

References

External links
 Prague High School at Prague Public Schools
  at international business times: State of play

Buildings and structures in Lincoln County, Oklahoma
Educational institutions established in 1906
Public high schools in Oklahoma
1906 establishments in Oklahoma Territory